The Baker River North is a tributary of the Baker River, flowing in Canada:
 Quebec: in administrative region of Bas-Saint-Laurent, in Temiscouata Regional County Municipality, in the municipality of Packington, Quebec and Saint-Jean-de-la-Lande, Quebec;
 New Brunswick (northwest part): Madawaska County, municipality of Baker Brook, New Brunswick.

Geography 

The "Baker River North" takes its source in "Lake Pelletier" which is the southwest side of the road North 8th and 9th, in the municipality of Packington, Quebec. This source is located at:
  west of the border between Quebec and New Brunswick;
  north of pointe North of Lake Méruimticook which straddles the border between Quebec and New Brunswick;
  northwest from the village center of Packington, Quebec which is located in Quebec.

  to the southeast, along the southwest side of the North 8th and 9th rank road to the bridge at Lake Road Jerry;
  to the southeast, to the boundary of the municipality of Saint-Jean-de-la-Lande, Quebec;
  to the southeast to Main Street (8th and 9th South Road rank);
  eastwards to "Little Baker Creek";

The "Baker River North" flows into a river bend on the north bank of the Baker River (New Brunswick) at Baker Brook, New Brunswick, in Madawaska County.

From the confluence of "Baker River North", the Baker River (New Brunswick) flows Southeast to the North shore of Saint John River (Bay of Fundy). It passes through the New Brunswick to the southeast to the north bank of the Bay of Fundy, which opens to the southwest in the Atlantic Ocean.

The confluence of the "Baker River North" is located at:
  Northwest of the confluence of the Baker River (New Brunswick) which flows into the city of Edmundston;
  South of border between Quebec and New Brunswick.

Toponymy

The term "Baker" is an English original family surname.

See also 

 Packington, Quebec, a municipality of Quebec
 Saint-Jean-de-la-Lande, Quebec, a municipality of Quebec
 Temiscouata Regional County Municipality, a RCM Quebec
 Baker Brook, New Brunswick, a municipality of New Brunswick
 Madawaska County, a county of New Brunswick
 Baker River (New Brunswick)
 Saint John River (Bay of Fundy)
 List of rivers of Quebec
 List of rivers of New Brunswick

References

External links 

2Baker North
Rivers of Madawaska County, New Brunswick
Rivers of Bas-Saint-Laurent